Comfort is the debut studio album by British band Splashh, first released on 4 June 2013 in the US on Kanine Records, then on 2 September 2013 through Luv Luv Luv Records in the UK. It was released as a digital download, Digipak CD and on transparent blue vinyl. A limited edition version was released on transparent blue vinyl with a bonus 10-inch EP, in which some copies were signed.

The first single to be released from the album was "Need It", released in July 2012. The second single was "Vacation" released in November 2012, which was followed by "All I Wanna Do" in May 2013, and then "Feels Like You" in July 2013.

Track listing

Release history

References 

2013 debut albums
Kanine Records albums